The Center of the World is a 2001 American drama film directed by Wayne Wang and shot on digital video. It stars Peter Sarsgaard as a dot-com millionaire who hires a drummer/stripper (Molly Parker) to stay with him in Las Vegas for three days for US$10,000. The film was screened out of competition at the 2001 Cannes Film Festival.

Plot
A couple checks into a hotel suite in Las Vegas. Flashbacks show that he's a computer whiz on the verge of becoming a dot-com millionaire. She's a lap dancer at a club. He's depressed, withdrawing from work, missing meetings with investors. He wants a connection, so he offers her $10,000 to spend three nights with him in Vegas. She accepts with conditions: four hours per night of erotic play, and no penetration.

During the days in Vegas, they get to know each other, have fun, and meet a friend of hers, casino dealer Jerri. After the first night, things get complicated. When the three days are over, the stripper makes it clear that she was only there for the money and that the man she spent the time with was just a client. Upset that his feelings aren't reciprocated, he rapes her; she makes no attempt to stop him. She then masturbates for him, achieving orgasm, saying "you want to see real? I'll show you real." The next day he returns home heartbroken.

The movie ends with his return to the strip club to see the woman he fell in love with again. She greets him fondly but interacts with him the way she had when they first met: as a stripper and a client ordering a lap dance.

Because the film is shown in a non-linear format, it is left to the viewer to interpret the ending. One could believe that the film ends with the meeting at the strip club and a chance for the two characters to have a real relationship together, or one could believe that the strip club meeting occurred earlier in time and the film ends with the characters going their separate ways in life.

Cast

 Peter Sarsgaard as Richard Longman
 Molly Parker as Florence
 Mel Gorham as Roxanne
 Shane Edelman as Porter
 Karry Brown as Lap dancer
 Alisha Klass as Pandora stripper 
 Lisa Newlan as Porn site woman
 Jason Calacanis as Pete
 Travis Miljan as Dog owner
 Jerry Sherman as Old man
 Carla Gugino as Jerri
 Pat Morita as Taxi driver
 Balthazar Getty as Brian Pivano
 Robert Lefkowitz as Motel manager
 John Lombardo as Gondolier

Production

Development 
In January 2000, Wayne Wang announced plans to direct The Center of the World for Artisan Entertainment. Wang said he "wanted to make a really erotic film about sex and love, that could be like ‘The Last Tango in Paris’ for a younger generation. I wanted to do a movie about this young generation of guys who are dealing with the Internet, software and day-trading; this whole new world out there where they’re making shitloads of money fast, and not knowing what their lives are about yet besides that money and easy pleasures." Wang chose to shoot the film on digital video, saying "I’ve seen the way the stuff is shot and transferred, and it looks beautiful and interesting in its own way. It’s also flexible, fast and cheaper."

When Wang initially committed to the project, he was at a loss as to what to write for the script. He sought assistance from previous collaborator Paul Auster; Siri Hustvedt, Auster’s wife, and Miranda July. Hustvedt had written extensively on the subjects of sex and feminism, while July had experience in striptease and dancing. Wang drew inspiration from Nan Goldin's photography when envisioning the look of the film. The screenplay was credited to "Ellen Benjamin Wong", a joint pseudonym for Wang, Auster, and Hustvedt. Internet executive Jason Calacanis appeared in and acted as an advisor for the film.

Filming 
Wang chose to set the story in Las Vegas because it is a symbolic "fantasyland" of a place. More traditional film cameras were used at the beginning and end of the story, while Wang used the grainier look of a Sony DRV-100 for the rest of the film to illustrate the "deterioration of [the characters'] relationship." Scenes requiring nudity from the characters were performed by body doubles.

The film's title may be an allusion to Courbet's L'Origine du monde.

Reception

Release 
The Center of the World was given a limited release in the U.S. on April 20, 2001. It was released without a rating from the MPAA as the filmmakers did not want to edit the film's graphic scenes of nudity and sexuality, which includes both female and male full frontal nudity.

Censorship controversy 
A Cincinnati theater owner attracted media attention after allegedly ordering a member of his staff to edit a five-second scene from the film a day before its release. According to Cincinnati CityBeat, Esquire Theater owner Gary Goldman instructed his theater manager and projectionist to cut the scene in which a female stripper (portrayed by adult film actress Alisha Klass) inserts a lollipop into her vagina.

The film's website also generated controversy for featuring an interactive strip club, including a faux online sex chat hosted by Klass.

Critical response 
Rotten Tomatoes gives the film a negative rating of 34% based on 82 reviews. The site's consensus reads: "For all its tease, the movie doesn't have more to say than money can't buy you love". At Metacritic, which assigns a normalized rating to reviews, the film has an average weighted score of 44 out of 100, based on 24 critics, indicating "mixed or average reviews". 

Critics compared The Center of the World to films like Last Tango in Paris and 9½ Weeks. Writing for Variety, Dennis Harvey said, "In contrast to most upscale sex drama efforts, Center expends considerable effort on viewing the 'world' from both sides of the usual gender equation." He added the "pic’s tension derives from the ambivalent nature of [Richard and Florence's] relationship", and that Sarsgaard creates a "nuanced" character "as a manchild-ish introvert." Though Harvey commended Wang on drawing credible performances from his leads, he also said the story lacks drive and does not fully explore the characters' psychology. 

Harvey also noted the film's "most impressive aspect is its successful pitching of 'the world’s oldest profession' as a problematic but viable personal choice: No one is exploiting Florence, who is far from the usual doomed, drug-addled or airheaded prostie figure seen on screen." Of the film's setting, Harvey said, "Arriving just when the dot-com boom has gone bust, Center’s high-tech nouveau riche angle may strike some viewers as already dated, but in the long run will add a creditable specificity of time/place."

Critic Roger Ebert gave the film a score of 3.5/4 stars and said the characters' psychological mind games with each other are the film's most fascinating aspect. He wrote, "If you understand who the characters are and what they're supposed to represent, the performances are right on the money. Flo is not supposed to be a sexy tart, and Richard is not supposed to be a lustful client. They're sides of the same coin and very much alike." 

Molly Parker was nominated for an Independent Spirit Award for Best Female Lead.

Notes

External links
 
 The Center of the World at AllMovie
 The Center of the World at Box Office Mojo

2001 films
2000s erotic drama films
Artisan Entertainment films
2000s English-language films
American erotic drama films
Films about prostitution in the United States
Films directed by Wayne Wang
2001 independent films
Films set in the Las Vegas Valley
Films shot in the Las Vegas Valley
2001 drama films
Films about striptease
2000s American films